Poladlı (also, Poladly and Polatly) is a village in the Qubadli Rayon of Azerbaijan.

Poladlı is Azeri village in Qubadli

References 

Populated places in Qubadli District